Emilio Lara Contreras (born 18 May 2002) is a Mexican professional footballer who plays as a defender for Liga MX club América.

Club career

Club América
Lara made his Liga MX debut on 6 November 2021, in a match that ended as a 0–0 tie against Monterrey.

International career

Youth
Lara was part of the under-17 side that participated at the 2019 CONCACAF U-17 Championship, where Mexico won the competition. He also participated at the 2019 U-17 World Cup, where Mexico finished runner-up.

Senior
Lara was called up to the senior national team by Gerardo Martino on 6 December 2021.

Career statistics

Club

International

Honours
Mexico U17
CONCACAF U-17 Championship: 2019
FIFA U-17 World Cup runner-up: 2019

References

External links
 
 
 

2002 births
Living people
People from Atizapán de Zaragoza
Association football defenders
Liga MX players
Club América footballers
Footballers from the State of Mexico
Mexico youth international footballers
Mexico under-20 international footballers
Mexico international footballers
Mexican footballers